The first season of Brothers & Sisters, an American serialized family-drama television series created by Jon Robin Baitz, began airing on September 24, 2006, on ABC. 

Brothers and Sisters follows the lives of The Walker Family who include: Nora Walker, her brother Saul and her children Sarah, Kitty, Tommy, Kevin, and Justin. The series began with the death of Nora's husband William Walker and follows the discovery that he had a twenty-year affair with Holly Harper and the fact that William and Holly had a child together, Rebecca, that no one knew about. As well as this central plot bringing the family together, each character must deal with the events of their personal lives.

Cast
Brothers & Sisters introduces Nora Walker (Sally Field) and her children; Sarah (Rachel Griffiths), Tommy (Balthazar Getty), Kitty (Calista Flockhart), Kevin (Matthew Rhys) and Justin (Dave Annable) each with their own lives and problems. Husband and father William Walker (portrayed by Tom Skerritt) heads the family. However, his death in the opening episode reveals hidden secrets that serve to test the family and their business 'Ojai Foods' to the limits. 

Patricia Wettig stars as Holly Harper; William's longtime mistress and Emily VanCamp appears mid-season as Rebecca Harper; Holly's daughter.

Main
Dave Annable as Justin Walker
Sally Field as Nora Walker
Calista Flockhart as Kitty Walker
Balthazar Getty as Tommy Walker
Rachel Griffiths as Sarah Walker
Sarah Jane Morris as Julia Walker
John Pyper-Ferguson as Joe Whedon
Matthew Rhys as Kevin Walker
Ron Rifkin as Saul Holden
Patricia Wettig as Holly Harper
Kerris Dorsey as Paige Whedon (regular since episode 12)
Emily VanCamp as Rebecca Harper (regular since episode 15)

Recurring and notable guest stars
Tom Skerritt as William Walker
Josh Hopkins as Warren Salter
Jason Lewis as Chad Berry
Rob Lowe as Robert McCallister
Luke Macfarlane as Scotty Wandell
Tyler Posey as Gabe Whedon
Maxwell Perry Cotton as Cooper Whedon
Eric Winter as Jason McCallister
Matthew Settle as Jonathan Sellers
 Marika Dominczyk as Tyler Altamirano

Storylines

Sarah, Tommy and Saul - who are most involved with the Walker family business - learn that William embezzled the company's funds. The business revelation also reveals two major revelations on the personal front: William had a mistress, Holly Harper (Patricia Wettig) whom he kept for decades, and the couple were believed to have had a child, Rebecca (Emily VanCamp). The first half of the season introduces the family and their search into William's secrets around Ojai. The second half focuses on Rebecca and her integration into the Walker family. Her mother (Holly) also becomes involved, as she goes into business with Tommy to open 'Walker Landing,' a vineyard.

Nora
Although Nora is devastated by the death of her husband and the secrets he harbored, she reveals that she knew he was having an affair but she chose to ignore it. She is deeply hurt by the depth of his relationship with Holly upon discovering he bought her a house. Nora embarks on a short romance with her contractor; however, this ends when she realizes she is not ready to date.

Nora begins to express her feelings through writing after finding stories she had written when she was younger and begins to take a class at a local college. Here, she meets and begins dating her professor Mark even though she finds out he has dated one of his other, much younger students. This relationship ends at the opening of 'Walker Landing,' when he kisses Holly and Nora tells him they do not work as a couple. Nora becomes stronger and heals throughout the course of the season, although she struggles with the idea of Justin going back to war and finds it difficult, in the beginning of the season, to work through her issues with Kitty. However, they re-bond through the season and see Justin off at the airport in the season finale.

Sarah & Joe
Sarah and Joe's marriage hits the rocks as they begin to drift apart.  Sarah becomes jealous of Joe and the mother of one of his music students. The marriage is further strained when Joe kisses Rebecca. Although they try to move past this, they eventually decide to divorce. Sarah also spends time with Tommy trying to unlock the hidden accounts left by their father at the family business. After being introduced to Holly and discovering she had a child, Sarah figures out the password - the initials of all his children, including Rebecca - S,K,T,K,J,R.

Tommy & Julia
Tommy struggles after finding out that his father left Sarah as CEO of the Ojai Foods in his will. He and Sarah clash as he finds it hard reporting to her and Sarah fails to listen to his advice and respect his experience with the company. After Holly decides to use her shares and become involved in the business, she reveals that William planned to open a winery and that it was his plan to have Tommy run it. Tommy decides to leave Ojai and do just this with Holly as his partner. Together, they open 'Walker Landing.'

After he and Julia try for months to conceive, Tommy discovers he is sterile. They turn to Kevin and Justin for support as possible surrogates. Both brothers decide to give sperm, but never discover whose sperm is ultimately used.  Everyone is thrilled when Tommy & Julia discover they are expecting twins; however, tragedy strikes when Julia goes into early labor and gives birth to a boy, William, and a girl, Elizabeth. The doctors inform the new parents that William won't make it, and that they must operate on Elizabeth or risk losing her too.

Kitty
Kitty begins the series living in New York with her long-term boyfriend Jonathan, who proposes. After she is offered a job on a political talk show 'Red White and Blue,' she considers moving back to California, which causes strain in their relationship. Kitty then sleeps with her co-host, Warren, which ends her engagement and she moves back in with her mother. This causes unresolved issues between them to resurface as Nora blames Kitty for Justin's decision to enlist in the war. Although she and Warren try to begin a relationship, they hit many obstacles and eventually end things. When she interviews Senator Robert McCallister, he offers her a job on his communications staff, which she takes. This causes conflict with her brother, Kevin, as he disagrees with McCallister's views, especially on gay marriage. After fighting it for months, Kitty and Robert finally acknowledge their feelings for each other and become engaged at the end of the season.

Kitty has the hardest time, out of all her brothers and sisters, accepting Rebecca into her life, a fact she does not hide from her half-sister.

Kevin
Kevin has a short-term relationship with Scotty, who he meets through work before beginning a secret fling with Chad Barry, a TV star, who cannot admit to his sexuality. Although Chad & Kevin carry on a secret relationship, this ends when Chad's girlfriend finds out and warns him about Chad's behavior. After an argument in which Kevin tells him he does not want the drama of being with someone who cannot be himself, Chad comes out to the public, but tells Kevin he needs to be alone.

Tensions rise between him and his sister Kitty when she takes a job with Senator Robert McCallister (Rob Lowe), as the Senator does not support gay marriage. Kevin is later introduced to Jason, Robert's gay brother, and they begin a relationship toward the end of the season.

Justin
Justin struggles with his drug addiction and his family's lack of faith in him; however, as the season progresses, he decides to stay clean and enters rehab. He has an on-again/off-again relationship with an old high school friend and short-time boss Tyler. But, they break up when she admits she cannot take being with someone recovering from drugs and that he shouldn't have to worry about her when he should be taking care of himself. He, out of all the brothers and sisters, spends more time with Rebecca and becomes closest to her. 

Later in the season, he receives a letter from the army ordering him to return to active duty which causes him to relapse. He asks his brother Kevin to help him out of it and although Kevin cannot stop him from going, Justin is given an extra six months at home to prepare and say his goodbyes. In the season finale, Justin leaves to serve.

Episodes

Production
The show was created by Ken Olin and Jon Robin Baitz. Greg Berlanti acts as executive producer and show runner for the first season. Brothers and Sisters is produced by Berlanti Television, After Portsmouth, and Touchstone Television (Fall 2006-Spring 2007), which is now ABC Studios (Fall 2007–present).

In the UK Brothers and Sisters was aired on Channel 4, premiering on June 20 at 20:30 with a double bill.

Season 1 is officially composed of 23 episodes, although 24 were produced during the season. The unaired episode, which was supposed to be episode 2, right after the pilot, contains scenes of William's funeral, also used in the actual episode 2. This ghost episode was taken out because of its slowliness.

Ratings
This season averaged 12.2 million viewers based on average total viewers each episode. This ranked the show at #37. In the UK, the show averaged approximately 2.2 million viewers and then settled to 600,000.

See also
 Season Two
 Season Three
 Season Four
 Season Five

References

2006 American television seasons
2007 American television seasons